{{DISPLAYTITLE:Tau6 Eridani}}

Tau6 Eridani, Latinized from τ6 Eridani, is a single star in the equatorial constellation of Eridanus, located near the constellation border with Fornax. It has a yellow-white hue with an apparent visual magnitude of 4.22, which is bright enough to be seen with the naked eye. Based upon parallax measurements, the distance to this star is around 57.5 light years. It is drifting further away with a radial velocity of +8 km/s.

The spectrum of Tau6 Eridani matches a stellar classification of F5IV-V, indicating it is an F-type star that shows traits of both a main sequence star and a subgiant. It has an estimated 135% of the Sun's mass and about 1.8 time the radius of the Sun. The star is radiating 5.5 times the luminosity of the Sun at an effective temperature of 6,508 K, and it does not display any surface magnetic activity. The star has been examined for infrared excess emission that could indicate the presence of circumstellar matter, but none has been detected.

References

F-type subgiants
Eridanus (constellation)
Eridani, Tau6
0155
Eridani, 27
023754
017651
1173
Durchmusterung objects